Miss Russia 2011, was held in the Crocus National Exhibition Hall in Moscow on March 7, 2011. 50 contestants from all over Russia competed for the crown. The winner will represents Russia into Miss Universe 2011 and Miss World 2011.

Each year, there are 477 beauty contests in states and cities of Russia to go to compete in the Miss Russia. Each year, 4 months before the national competition, a pre-preliminary happens in Moscow to select the 50 official candidates.

Results

Placements

Contestants

Judges
Aliona Doletskaya
Dmitry Malikov
Ximena Navarrete
Arkady Novikov
Lyasan Utiasheva

References

External links
 Miss Russia Official Website

Miss Russia
2011 beauty pageants
2011 in Russia